Nice Horse is an all-female Canadian country band, consisting of Brandi Sidoryk, Krista Wodelet, Katie Rox, and Tara McLeod. The all-female band has performed at high-profile festivals across the country and toured with legendary artists such as Tom Cochrane and the Nitty Gritty Dirt Band. Accolades garnered in their 6 years together include five CCMA nominations, 4 YYC Music Awards, 5 Country Music Alberta Awards and the 2021 Western Canadian Music Award for Country Artist of the Year.

The band has released one studio album entitled "There Goes the Neighbourhood" (2017) and one EP called "A Little Unstable" (2017).

History

Formation
Nice Horse started in Hawaii with what was initially a girls trip to hang out and write songs. It evolved into the first self-contained all-female country band in Canada. In the summer of 2016 they opened for The Kentucky Headhunters in Lloydminster and played Big Valley Jamboree. In the fall of 2016 they signed with Coalition Music Management. In early 2017, they toured with Tom Cochrane on the Mad Mad World 25th anniversary tour. The band provided opening support sets on various dates across western Canada and joined Tom's band for three songs in Edmonton, Toronto, and Oshawa.

The band released their first EP entitled "A Little Unstable", produced by Jeff Dalziel and Bob Rock, on February 24, 2017. On September 8, 2017, Nice Horse released their debut album entitled "There Goes the Neighbourhood", also produced by Jeff Dalziel and Bob Rock, which featured singles "Mansplainin'" and "Pony Up". They have shared the stage with Jess Moskaluke, Gord Bamford, Aaron Goodvin, and Washboard Union. They were nominated for two Alberta Country Music Awards in 2017 and named Best in Calgary as one of the top three musical acts. They have played large festivals such as The Calgary Stampede, Boots & Hearts, Dauphin Countryfest, Big Valley Jamboree, Rockin' River Music Fest, and the Red Truck Concert Series. They were nominated for a CCMA Award for Interactive Artist or Group of the Year in 2018.

Project Wild
Nice Horse placed second in the 2017 Project Wild competition hosted by Calgary radio station Wild 95.3.

Horses 4 Heroes
Nice Horse teamed up with Can Praxis with Horses 4 Heroes. This foundation uses horses in order to help veterans with posttraumatic stress disorder (PTSD). The band has done concerts in order to raise money and awareness for this foundation. They also released a standalone single entitled "O Holy Night" in 2017 with all proceeds going towards this foundation.

Pony Up
On July 4, 2017, Nice Horse released their debut single "Pony Up" from their debut EP entitled "A Little Unstable". The music video for this song debuted alongside the announcement that they were named CMT Fresh Face Feature Artist

Mansplainin'
The music video for "Mansplainin'" premiered on March 8, 2018, for International Women's Day. The video shows the experiences that the band has with men and shows the band pushing for progression. They also premiered a live version of the song on Facebook Live at Facebook headquarters in Toronto, Ontario.

Hot Mess 
The single "Hot Mess" was released on March 5, 2020. This song is an opportunity to acknowledge and celebrate that no matter how much you have it together, nobody's perfect—and that's ok! The official music video for Hot Mess premiered on YouTube on May 18, 2020. The video was directed by Lisa Mann and stars Toronto-based drag queen Jezebel Bardot and has a special cameo from RuPaul's Drag Race All Stars winner Trixie Mattel.

Cowgirl 
The single "Cowgirl" was released on June 19, 2020. Top Download and Top CanCon Download by DMDS/Yangaroo in Canada, charting in the top #32, featured on Radio Disney Country. Produced by multi-platinum award winning producer Jeff Dalziel (The Washboard Union, Dan Davidson, Megan Patrick)

High school 
The single "High School" was released on January 22, 2021.

Good At Missing You 
The single "Good At Missing You" was released on June 4, 2021.

Band members

Current members
Katie Rox (Vocals, Banjo, Guitar, Keys)
Brandi Sidoryk (Vocals, Bass, Keys)
Krista Wodelet (Vocals, Drums, Percussion, Keys)
Tara McLeod (Guitar)

Past members
Kaley Beisiegel (Vocals, Guitars, Mandolin)

Awards and recognition
Winner of the 2021 Western Canadian Music Awards for Country Artist of the Year
Band members Brandi Sidoryk and Krista Wodelet were nominated for Video Director(s) of the Year for the "High School" music video at the 2021 CCMAs
3 wins for the 2020 Country Music Alberta Awards (Interactive Artist of the Year, Horizon Single of the Year [Cowgirl], Horizon Group of the Year)
6 nominations for the 2020 Country Music Alberta Awards (Horizon Group of the Year, Horizon Single of the Year [Cowgirl], Video of the Year [Hot Mess], Interactive Artist of the Year, Musician of the Year [Brandi Sidoryk], Fan’s Choice) 
Nominated for 4 consecutive Interactive Artist/Group of the Year at the CCMAs (2018, 2019, 2020, 2021)
Fan's Choice Award nominees and Group/Duo of the Year nominees at the 2017 Alberta Country Music Awards
Second place in the 2017 Project Wild competition
Named an Emerging Canadian Artist to Watch For by Canadian Beats magazine
Nominated for Interactive Artist or Group of the Year at the 2018 CCMA Awards
Nominated for Country Recording of the Year for the song "Mansplainin'", Group of the Year, Songwriter of the Year for the song "Mansplainin'", as well as Single of the Year for "Mansplainin'" at the 2018 YYC Music Awards in Calgary
Winner of 2018 YYC Music Award for Country Recording of the Year for the song "Mansplainin'"
Winner of 2019 Alberta Country Music Awards (ACMAs) for Group of the Year and Video of the Year for "Mansplainin'"
Nominated for Country Recording of the Year, Group of the Year and Music Video of the Year at the 2019 YYC Music Awards
Pending nomination for Interactive Artist or Group of the Year at the 2021 CCMA Awards
3 wins for the 2022 Country Music Alberta Awards ("High School" Video of the Year, Community Spirit Award, Interactive Artist of the Year
Winner of Best Country Video for their music video "High School" by the Canadian Independent Music Video Awards
Winner of Music Video of the Year for "High School" at the 2022 Canadian Country Music Awards

Discography

Albums
There Goes the Neighbourhood (2017)

EPs
A Little Unstable (2017)

Singles
Pony Up (2017)
O Holy Night (2017) 
Mansplainin' (2017)
Good Life (2019)
Hot Mess (2020)
Cowgirl (2020)
Ugly Christmas Sweater (2020)
High School (2021)
Good At Missing You (2021)

References

External links
 

All-female bands
Canadian country music groups
Musical groups established in 2015
Musical groups from Alberta
2015 establishments in Alberta